Castnia fernandezi is a moth in the Castniidae family. It is found in Venezuela (Amazonas State).

The length of the forewings is 38–40 mm. Adults are dark brown with a green hue. There is a cream coloured band extending from the costal margin to the inner angle. Another cream band is found in the subapical area, extending from the costal margin to the lateral margin. A third, sinuous, light brown band starts at the anal lobe and extends to the middle of the wing. The dorsal part of the hindwing has an orange base, while the rest of the wing is dark brown. Females are very similar to males, but larger in size.

References

Moths described in 1992
Castniidae